Sing a Song with Riddle is the seventh studio album by American composer and arranger Nelson Riddle, released in 1959. The album consists of arrangements for a vocalist but without a singer; a lyric sheet was supplied with the original album package for buyers to sing along with at home. The original inspiration for the album was a series of albums for amateur instrumentalists called Music Minus One on Command Records.

Reception

William Ruhlmann reviewed the album for Allmusic and wrote: As mere listening experiences, many of these tracks are not actually recognized as the songs listed on the LP jacket, but no doubt they would be if Sinatra was singing over them. Sometimes, Riddle uses a bit of the melody, but much of the time, this remains background music that needs to be completed by someone else. It's a clever gimmick and a bit of joke, and it shows how far Riddle's treatments can stray from the lead sheets on occasion. 

Ruhlmann concluded that "unless the buyer is standing by with the sheet music ready and a good voice to add on top" the album was an "incomplete experience."

Track listing

Side 1

 "Little White Lies" (Walter Donaldson) – 1:47
 "Darn That Dream" (Eddie DeLange, Jimmy Van Heusen) – 2:54
 "Near You" (Craig Francis, Kermit Goell) – 2:49
 "Day In, Day Out" (Rube Bloom, Johnny Mercer) – 2:05
 "The More I See You" (Mack Gordon, Harry Warren) – 2:51
 "My Baby Just Cares for Me" (Donaldson, Gus Kahn) – 2:05

Side 2
 "Everywhere You Go" (Mark Fisher, Joe Goodwin, Larry Shay) – 2:07
 "I Had the Craziest Dream" (Gordon, Harry Warren) – 2:51
 "Fools Rush In" (Bloom, Mercer) – 3:03
 "You Make Me Feel So Young" (Gordon, Josef Myrow) – 2:08
 "It's a Sin to Tell a Lie" (Billy Mayhew) – 2:51
 "You're Driving Me Crazy! (What Did I Do?)" (Donaldson) – 1:47

Personnel
Nelson Riddle – arranger

References

External links
 

1959 albums
Albums arranged by Nelson Riddle
Capitol Records albums
Instrumental albums
Nelson Riddle albums